Ésta es tu vida is the sixth album recorded by Spanish rock band Hombres G, released in 1990.

Track listing

* The CD version adds three "b" sides from album singles.

Personnel 

 David Summers – vocals, bass
 Rafa Gutiérrez – guitar
 Daniel Mezquita – guitar
 Javier Molina – drums

References

External links
 Official site
 Discography

1990 albums
Hombres G albums